The Search for Everything: Wave Two (also shortened as Wave Two) is an extended play (EP) by American singer-songwriter John Mayer. Released on February 24, 2017 by Columbia and Sony Music, the EP contains four tracks from Mayer's seventh studio album, The Search for Everything, and is a follow-up to its predecessor EP, The Search for Everything: Wave One. It includes the lead single "Still Feel Like Your Man".

Background
The Search for Everything: Wave Two is a follow-up to John Mayer's EP, The Search for Everything: Wave One, which are the first and second EPs published leading up to the release of his seventh studio album, The Search for Everything, which was released on April 14, 2017.

Release
The EP was first announced by Mayer on his official Twitter account, revealing its track listing, album art cover, and release date. Prior to the release of The Search for Everything: Wave One, Mayer confirmed that he would release his seventh studio album across three four-song EPs.

On March 1, Mayer made a surprise guest appearance on Jimmy Kimmel Live!, and performed "Still Feel Like Your Man" with his full backing band for his promotional tour.

Commercial performance 
The Search for Everything: Wave Two  debuted at number 13 on the US Billboard 200, earning 31,000 album-equivalent units for the week ending March 18, 2017. It was the seventh best-selling album of the week, selling 26,000 traditional albums in its first week. Wave One became Mayer's sixth number-one album on the Billboard Top Rock Albums.

Track listing

Personnel

Musicians
John Mayer – vocals, guitars
Steve Jordan – drums, percussion
Pino Palladino – bass guitar
Larry Goldings – keyboards
Aaron Sterling – drums (on “Roll It on Home”) and percussion (on “Still Feel Like Your Man” and “Roll It on Home”)
James Fauntleroy – keyboards (on “Still Feel Like Your Man”)
 Al Jardine – backing vocals on “Emoji of a Wave” 
 Matt Jardine – backing vocals on “Emoji of a Wave”

Production
Steve Jordan – executive producer
Chad Franscoviak – producer, engineering
John Mayer – producer
Chris Galland – mixing
Manny Marroquin – mixing
Greg Calbi – mastering

Charts

References

2017 EPs
John Mayer EPs
Columbia Records EPs
Sony Music EPs
Albums recorded at Capitol Studios